Johann Daniel Mylius (c. 15831642) was a composer for the lute, and writer on alchemy. Born at Wetter in present-day Hesse, Germany, he went on to study theology and medicine at the University of Marburg. He was the brother-in-law and pupil of Johann Hartmann (1568–1613).

In 1616, while still a medical student, Mylius published Duncan Burnet's Iatrochymicus. The , Mylius' own alchemical work, was published two years later. He is known for the collection  (1622) of pieces for the lute. In the same year his  was published. Mylius was the personal physician of Moritz of Hessen and his patrons included Maurice and Frederick Henry of Nassau.

Works
Opus medico-chymicum. 1618.
Antidotarium. 1620.
Philosophia reformata. 1622.
Anatomia auri. 1628.
Danielis Milii Pharmacopoeae spagyricae, sive Practicae universalis Galeno-chymicae libri duo. - Francofurti : Schönwetter, 1628. digital edition

References

External links
Recolored emblems from Philosophia reformata

1580s births
1642 deaths
Musicians from Hesse
Year of birth uncertain
German alchemists
German lutenists
Renaissance composers
German male classical composers
German classical composers
17th-century alchemists
People from Marburg-Biedenkopf